The Colonial Series is a series of books written by Edward Stratemeyer starting in 1901.

Summary
The Colonial Series books are historical fiction that are set in the colonial period of the United States. It follows the story of a young man, David Morris, through a number of conflicts, starting with the French and Indian War.

Historical accuracy
Stratemeyer consulted many reliable sources including the writings of George Washington in the preparation of this work.

Books in the series
The series consists of six books. They start at the beginning of the French and Indian War and go almost to the American Revolution.
 With Washington in the West
 Marching on Niagara
 At the Fall of Montreal
 On the Trail of Pontiac
 The fort in the Wilderness
 Trail and Trading-Post

With Washington in the West
Washington in the West tells something of George Washington’s youthful experience as a surveyor and his leadership of colonial forces in the French and Indian War. The hero, David Morris, is several years younger than Washington, with whom he becomes intimately associated. The book covers the adventures of David Morris in battles of the early French and Indian War, as well as in general pioneer life and his time surveying with Washington. The story relates the battles of Great Meadows and Braddock's defeat.

Sources

External links
At Gask Castle Press

1900s books
Novel series